Homalopterula is a genus of hillstream loaches found only in Sumatra in Indonesia.

Species
There are currently 6 recognized species in this genus:
 Homalopterula amphisquamata M. C. W. Weber & de Beaufort, 1916
 Homalopterula gymnogaster Bleeker, 1853
 Homalopterula heterolepis M. C. W. Weber & de Beaufort, 1916
 Homalopterula modiglianii Perugia, 1893
 Homalopterula ripleyi Fowler, 1940
 Homalopterula vanderbilti Fowler, 1940

References

Balitoridae